England’s Lane may refer to:
 England’s Lane (hymn tune),  a hymn tune by English composer Geoffrey Turton Shaw (1879–1943)
 England's Lane (Peter Sarstedt album), a 1997 album by Peter Sarstedt